Caesar of Dyrrhachium is numbered among the Seventy Disciples, and was bishop of Dyrrhachium, a district of Epirus in modern Albania.

The Church remembers St. Caesar on March 30 with Apostles Sosthenes, Apollos, Cephas, and Epaphroditus and on December 8 with the same apostles and Onesiphorus.

References

External links
Apostle Caesar of the Seventy (OCA)
The Choosing of the Seventy Holy Apostles
The Holy Apostles Sosthenes, Apollos, Tychicus, Epaphroditus, Onesiphorus, Cephas and Caesar (Prologue of Ohrid)

Seventy disciples
1st-century bishops in the Roman Empire
Eastern Orthodox saints